Tritetrabdella kinabaluensis is a species of terrestrial blood-feeding leech in the family Haemadipsidae. It has been observed exclusively from Sabah, Malaysia. The species is divided into two subspecies: Tritetrabdella kinabaluensis kinabaluensis and Tritetrabdella kinabaluensis inobongensis, the former being the typical subspecies. The species epithet derives from the sacred mountain Mount Kinabalu.

Appearance 
Tritetrabdella kinabaluensis has the following physical traits, regardless of subspecies:

 Fifty-five friction rays on the caudal sucker
 Creamy white to beige dorsum with brown stripes with dark outline.
 Female's gonopore in the posterior region of the seventh somite.

Footnotes

Notes

Citations 

Leeches
Fauna of Borneo

